Appedesis is a genus of beetles in the family Cerambycidae, which has the single species Appedesis vidua. It was described by Waterhouse in 1880.

References

Dorcasominae
Beetles described in 1880
Monotypic Cerambycidae genera